The Whyburn, or Town Brook is the main watercourse flowing through the town of Hucknall in the English county of Nottinghamshire. It rises in two separate springs at the foot of the Misk Hills by Whyburn Farm, and flows east into the town of Hucknall, past Whyburn Lane to which it also gives its name. The brook once drove several mills in Hucknall, the most notable example being close to the junction of Baker Street and Annesley Road near the town centre. In the History of Hucknall Torkard it is suggested that a mill pond once existed close to the former village green (now the Market Place). The name of the stream is thought to be derived from a Celtic word 'Wy' meaning 'water'. A school used to take the name of 'Whyburn'.

References

Bibliography

Rivers of Nottinghamshire
2Whyburn